Symphoricarpos orbiculatus, commonly called coralberry, buckbrush or Indian currant is a woody species of flowering plant in the honeysuckle family.

Description
Symphoricarpos orbiculatus is an erect shrub, with greenish-white purple-tinged flowers and rounded pink to purple fruits. The leaves are oval shaped, and arranged oppositely along the branches. The plant is monoecious, with male and female flowers on the same individual.

Distribution
Symphoricarpos orbiculatus is native to the eastern and central United States as well as central Canada (Ontario) and northeastern Mexico (Coahuila, Nuevo León).

References

orbiculatus
Bird food plants
Plants described in 1753
Taxa named by Carl Linnaeus
Flora of the Northeastern United States
Flora of the Southeastern United States
Flora of the North-Central United States
Flora of the South-Central United States
Flora of Northeastern Mexico
Flora without expected TNC conservation status